The Camino de Santiago ("Pilgrimage of Compostela"), known in English as the Way of St James, is a network of pilgrims' ways or pilgrimages leading to the shrine of the apostle Saint James the Great in the cathedral of Santiago de Compostela in Galicia in northwestern Spain, where tradition holds that the remains of the apostle are buried.

As Pope Benedict XVI said, "It is a way sown with so many demonstrations of fervour, repentance, hospitality, art and culture which speak to us eloquently of the spiritual roots of the Old Continent." Many still follow its routes as a form of spiritual path or retreat for their spiritual growth. It is also popular with hikers, cyclers, and organized tour groups.

Created and established after the discovery of the relics of Saint James the Great at the beginning of the 9th century, the Way of St James became a major pilgrimage route of medieval Christianity from the 10th century onwards. But it was only after the capture of Granada in 1492, under the reign of Ferdinand II of Aragon and Isabella I of Castile, that Pope Alexander VI officially declared the Camino de Santiago to be one of the "three great pilgrimages of Christendom", along with Jerusalem and the Via Francigena to Rome.

In 1987, the Camino, which encompasses several routes in Spain, France and Portugal, was declared the first Cultural Route of the Council of Europe. Since 2013, the Camino has attracted more than 200,000 pilgrims each year, with an annual growth rate of more than 10 percent. Pilgrims come mainly on foot and often from nearby cities, requiring several days of walking to reach Santiago. The French Way gathers two-thirds of the walkers, but other minor routes are experiencing a growth in popularity. The French Way and the routes in Spain were inscribed on the UNESCO World Heritage List, followed by the routes in France in 1998, because of their historical significance for Christianity as a major pilgrimage route and their testimony to the exchange of ideas and cultures across the routes.

Major Christian pilgrimage route 

The Way of St James was one of the most important Christian pilgrimages during the later Middle Ages, and a pilgrimage route on which a plenary indulgence could be earned; other major pilgrimage routes include the Via Francigena to Rome and the pilgrimage to Jerusalem. Legend holds that St James's remains were carried by boat from Jerusalem to northern Spain, where he was buried in what is now the city of Santiago de Compostela. (According to Spanish legends, Saint James had spent time preaching the gospel in Spain, but returned to Judaea upon seeing a vision of the Virgin Mary on the bank of the Ebro River.) 

Pilgrims on the Way can take one of dozens of pilgrimage routes to Santiago de Compostela. Traditionally, as with most pilgrimages, the Way of Saint James begins at one's home and ends at the pilgrimage site. However, a few of the routes are considered main ones. During the Middle Ages, the route was highly travelled. However, the Black Death, the Protestant Reformation, and political unrest in 16th century Europe led to its decline. By the 1980s, only a few hundred pilgrims per year registered in the pilgrim's office in Santiago.

Whenever St James's Day (25 July) falls on a Sunday, the cathedral declares a Holy or Jubilee Year. Depending on leap years, Holy Years occur in 5-, 6-, and 11-year intervals. The most recent were 1993, 1999, 2004, 2010 and 2021. The next will be 2027, and 2032.

History

Pre-Christian history 

The main pilgrimage route to Santiago follows an earlier Roman trade route, which continues to the Atlantic coast of Galicia, ending at Cape Finisterre. Although it is known today that Cape Finisterre, Spain's westernmost point, is not the westernmost point of Europe (Cabo da Roca in Portugal is further west), the fact that the Romans called it Finisterrae (literally the end of the world or Land's End in Latin) indicates that they viewed it as such. At night, the Milky Way overhead seems to point the way, so the route acquired the nickname "Voie lactée" – the Milky Way in French.

Scallop symbol 

The scallop shell, often found on the shores in Galicia, has long been the symbol of the Camino de Santiago. Over the centuries the scallop shell has taken on a variety of meanings, metaphorical, practical, and mythical, even if its relevance may have actually derived from the desire of pilgrims to take home a souvenir.

The most common myth about the origin of the symbol concerns the death of Saint James, who was martyred by beheading in Jerusalem in 44 AD. After James's death, his body was transported by a ship piloted by an angel, back to the Iberian Peninsula to be buried in what is now Santiago. As the ship approached land, a wedding was taking place on shore. The young groom was on horseback, and, upon seeing the ship's approach, his horse got spooked, and horse and rider plunged into the sea. Through miraculous intervention, the horse and rider emerged from the water alive, covered in seashells.

From its connection to the Camino, the scallop shell came to represent pilgrimage, both to a specific shrine as well as to heaven, recalling Hebrews 11:13, identifying that Christians "are pilgrims and strangers on the earth". The scallop shell is an ubiquitous sight along the Camino, where it often serves as a guide for pilgrims. The shell is even more commonly seen on the pilgrims themselves, who are thereby identified as pilgrims. Most pilgrims receive a shell at the beginning of their journey and display it throughout their journey. During the medieval period, the shell was more a proof of completion than a symbol worn during the pilgrimage. The pilgrim's staff is a walking stick used by pilgrims on the way to the shrine of Santiago de Compostela in Spain. Generally, the stick has a hook so that something may be hung from it; it may have a crosspiece. The usual form of representation is with a hook, but in some the hook is absent. The pilgrim's staff is represented under different forms and is referred to using different names, e.g. a pilgrim's crutch, a crutch-staff. The crutch, perhaps, should be represented with the transverse piece on the top of the staff (like the letter "T") instead of across it.

Medieval routes 

The earliest records of visits paid to the shrine at Santiago de Compostela date from the 9th century, in the time of the Kingdom of Asturias and Galicia. The pilgrimage to the shrine became the most renowned medieval pilgrimage, and it became customary for those who returned from Compostela to carry back with them a Galician scallop shell as proof of their completion of the journey. This practice gradually led to the scallop shell becoming the badge of a pilgrim.

The earliest recorded pilgrims from beyond the Pyrenees visited the shrine in the middle of the 11th century, but it seems that it was not until a century later that large numbers of pilgrims from abroad were regularly journeying there. The earliest records of pilgrims that arrived from England belong to the period between 1092 and 1105. However, by the early 12th century the pilgrimage had become a highly organized affair.

One of the great proponents of the pilgrimage in the 12th century was Pope Callixtus II, who started the Compostelan Holy Years.

The official guide in those times was the Codex Calixtinus. Published around 1140, the 5th book of the Codex is still considered the definitive source for many modern guidebooks. Four pilgrimage routes listed in the Codex originate in France and converge at Puente la Reina. From there, a well-defined route crosses northern Spain, linking Burgos, Carrión de los Condes, Sahagún, León, Astorga, and Compostela.

The daily needs of pilgrims on their way to and from Compostela were met by a series of hospitals. Indeed, these institutions contributed to the development of the modern concept of ‘hospital’. Some Spanish towns still bear the name, such as Hospital de Órbigo. The hospitals were often staffed by Catholic orders and under royal protection. Donations were encouraged but many poorer pilgrims had few clothes and poor health often barely getting to the next hospital.

Romanesque architecture, a new genre of ecclesiastical architecture, was designed with massive archways to cope with huge crowds of the devout.

There was also the sale of the now-familiar paraphernalia of tourism, such as badges and souvenirs. Pilgrims often prayed to Saint Roch whose numerous depictions with the Cross of St James can still be seen along the Way.

The pilgrimage route to Santiago de Compostela was made possible by the protection and freedom provided by the Kingdom of France, from which the majority of pilgrims originated. Enterprising French (including Gascons and other peoples not under the French crown) settled in towns along the pilgrimage routes, where their names appear in the archives. The pilgrims were tended by people like Domingo de la Calzada, who was later recognized as a saint.

Pilgrims walked the Way of St James, often for months and occasionally years at a time, to arrive at the great church in the main square of Compostela and pay homage to St James. Many arrived with very little due to illness or robbery or both. Traditionally pilgrims lay their hands on the pillar just inside the doorway of the cathedral, and so many now have done this it has visibly worn away the stone.

The popular Spanish name for the astronomical Milky Way is El Camino de Santiago. According to a common medieval legend, the Milky Way was formed from the dust raised by travelling pilgrims.

Another legend states that when a hermit saw a bright star shining over a hillside near San Fiz de Solovio, he informed the bishop of Iria Flavia, who found a grave at the site with three bodies inside, one of which, he asserted, was that of St James. Subsequently, the location was called "the field of the star" (Campus Stellae, corrupted to "Compostela").

Another origin myth mentioned in Book IV of the Book of Saint James relates how the saint appeared in a dream to Charlemagne, urging him to liberate his tomb from the Moors and showing him the direction to follow by the route of the Milky Way.

Pilgrimage as penance 
The Church employed (and employs) rituals (the sacrament of confession) that can lead to the imposition by a priest of penance, through which the sinner atones for his or her sins. Pilgrimages were deemed to be a suitable form of expiation for sin and long pilgrimages would be imposed as penance for very serious sins. As noted in the Catholic Encyclopedia:

Pilgrimages could also be imposed as judicial punishment for crime, a practice that is still occasionally used today. For example, a tradition in Flanders persists of pardoning and releasing one prisoner every year under the condition that, accompanied by a guard, the prisoner walks to Santiago wearing a heavy backpack.

Enlightenment era 
During the American Revolution, John Adams (who would become the second President of the United States) was ordered by Congress to go to Paris to obtain funds for the cause. His ship started leaking and he disembarked with his two sons at Finisterre in 1779. From there, he proceeded to follow the Way of St James in the reverse direction of the pilgrims' route, in order to get to Paris overland. He did not stop to visit Santiago, which he later regretted. In his autobiography, Adams described the customs and lodgings afforded to St James's pilgrims in the 18th century and he recounted the legend as it was told to him:

Modern-day pilgrimage 

Although it is commonly believed that the pilgrimage to Santiago has continued without interruption since the Middle Ages, few modern pilgrimages antedate the 1957 publication of Irish Hispanist and traveler Walter Starkie's The Road to Santiago. The revival of the pilgrimage was supported by the Spanish government of Francisco Franco, much inclined to promote Spain's Catholic history. "It has been only recently (1990s) that the pilgrimage to Santiago regained the popularity it had in the Middle Ages."
 
Since then, hundreds of thousands (over 300,000 in 2017) of Christian pilgrims and many others set out each year from their homes, or from popular starting points across Europe, to make their way to Santiago de Compostela. Most travel by foot, some by bicycle, and some even travel as their medieval counterparts did, on horseback or by donkey. In addition to those undertaking a religious pilgrimage, many are hikers who walk the route for travel or sport. Also, many consider the experience a spiritual retreat from modern life.

Routes 
Here, only a few routes are named. For a complete list of all the routes (traditional and less so), see: Camino de Santiago (route descriptions).

The Camino Francés, or French Way, is the most popular. The Via Regia is the last portion of the (Camino Francés). Historically, because of the Codex Calixtinus, most pilgrims came from France: typically from Arles, Le Puy, Paris, and Vézelay; some from Saint Gilles. Cluny, site of the celebrated medieval abbey, was another important rallying point for pilgrims and, in 2002, it was integrated into the official European pilgrimage route linking Vézelay and Le Puy.

Most Spanish consider the French border in the Pyrenees the natural starting point. By far the most common, modern starting point on the Camino Francés is Saint-Jean-Pied-de-Port, on the French side of the Pyrenees, with Roncesvalles on the Spanish side also being popular.

The Camino Primitivo, or Original Way, is the oldest route to Santiago de Compostela, first taken in the 9th century, which begins in Oviedo. Camino Portugués, or the Portuguese Way, is the second-most-popular route, starting at the cathedral in Lisbon (for a total of about 610 km) or at the cathedral in Porto in the north of Portugal (for a total of about 227 km), and crossing into Galicia at Valença.

The Camino del Norte, or Northern Way, is also less traveled and starts in the Basque city of Irun on the border with France, or sometimes in San Sebastián. It is a less popular route because of its changes in elevation, whereas the Camino Frances is mostly flat. The route follows the coast along the Bay of Biscay until it nears Santiago. Though it does not pass through as many historic points of interest as the Camino Frances, it has cooler summer weather. The route is believed to have been first used by pilgrims to avoid traveling through the territories occupied by the Muslims in the Middle Ages.

The Central European camino was revived after the Fall of the Berlin Wall. Medieval routes, Camino Baltico and the Via Regia in Poland pass through present-day Poland reach as far north as the Baltic states, taking in Vilnius, and Eastwards to present-day Ukraine and take in Lviv, Sandomierz and Kraków.

Accommodation 

In Spain, France, and Portugal, pilgrims' hostels with beds in dormitories provide overnight accommodation for pilgrims who hold a credencial (see below). In Spain this type of accommodation is called a refugio or albergue, both of which are similar to youth hostels or hostelries in the French system of gîtes d'étape.

Hostels may be run by a local parish, the local council, private owners, or pilgrims' associations. Occasionally, these refugios are located in monasteries, such as the one in the Monastery of San Xulián de Samos that is run by monks, and the one in Santiago de Compostela.

The final hostel on the route is the famous Hostal de los Reyes Católicos, which lies in the Praza do Obradoiro across the Cathedral. It was originally constructed as hospice and hospital for pilgrims by Queen Isabella I of Castile and King Ferdinand II of Aragon, the Catholic Monarchs. Today it is a luxury 5-star Parador hotel, which still provides free services to a limited number of pilgrims daily.

Credencial or pilgrim's passport 

Most pilgrims purchase and carry a document called the credencial, which gives access to overnight accommodation along the route. Also known as the "pilgrim's passport", the credencial is stamped with the official St. James stamp of each town or refugio at which the pilgrim has stayed. It provides pilgrims with a record of where they ate or slept and serves as proof to the Pilgrim's Office in Santiago that the journey was accomplished according to an official route and thus that the pilgrim qualifies to receive a compostela (certificate of completion of the pilgrimage).

Compostela 

The compostela is a certificate of accomplishment given to pilgrims on completing the Way. To earn the compostela one needs to walk a minimum of 100 km or cycle at least 200 km. In practice, for walkers, the closest convenient point to start is Sarria, as it has good bus and rail connections to other places in Spain. Pilgrims arriving in Santiago de Compostela who have walked at least the last , or cycled  to get there (as indicated on their credencial), and who state that their motivation was at least partially religious, are eligible for the compostela from the Pilgrim's Office in Santiago.

The compostela has been indulgenced since the Early Middle Ages and remains so to this day, during Holy Years. The English translation reads:

The simpler certificate of completion in Spanish for those with non-religious motivation reads:

English translation:

The Pilgrim's Office gives more than 100,000 compostelas each year to pilgrims from more than 100 countries. However, the requirements to earn a compostela ensure that not everyone who walks on the Camino receives one. The requirements for receiving a compostela are:
1) make the Pilgrimage for religious/spiritual reasons or at least have an attitude of search, 2) do the last 100 km on foot or horseback or the last 200 km by bicycle. 3) collect a certain number of stamps on a credencial.

Pilgrim's Mass 

A Pilgrim's Mass is held in the Cathedral of Santiago de Compostela each day at 12:00 and 19:30. Pilgrims who received the compostela the day before have their countries of origin and the starting point of their pilgrimage announced at the Mass. The Botafumeiro, one of the largest censers in the world, is operated during certain Solemnities and on every Friday, except Good Friday, at 19:30. Priests administer the Sacrament of Penance, or confession, in many languages. In the Holy Year of 2010 the Pilgrim's Mass was exceptionally held four times a day, at 10:00, 12:00, 18:00, and 19:30, catering for the greater number of pilgrims arriving in the Holy Year.

Pilgrimage as tourism 
The Xunta de Galicia (Galicia's regional government) promotes the Way as a tourist activity, particularly in Holy Compostela Years (when 25 July falls on a Sunday). Following Galicia's investment and advertising campaign for the Holy Year of 1993, the number of pilgrims completing the route has been steadily rising. The most recent Holy Year occurred in 2021, 11 years after the last Holy Year of 2010. More than 272,000 pilgrims made the trip during the course of 2010. The next Holy Year pilgrimage will occur in 2027.

In film and television 
(Chronological)

The pilgrimage is central to the plot of the film The Milky Way (1969), directed by surrealist Luis Buñuel. It is intended to critique the Catholic church, as the modern pilgrims encounter various manifestations of Catholic dogma and heresy.
The Naked Pilgrim (2003) documents the journey of art critic and journalist Brian Sewell to Santiago de Compostela for the UK's Channel Five. Travelling by car along the French route, he visited many towns and cities on the way including Paris, Chartres, Roncesvalles, Burgos, León and Frómista. Sewell, a lapsed Catholic, was moved by the stories of other pilgrims and by the sights he saw. The series climaxed with Sewell's emotional response to the Mass at Compostela.
The Way of St. James was the central feature of the film Saint Jacques... La Mecque (2005) directed by Coline Serreau.
In The Way (2010), written and directed by Emilio Estevez, Martin Sheen learns that his son (Estevez) has died early along the route and takes up the pilgrimage in order to complete it on the son's behalf. The film was presented at the Toronto International Film Festival in September 2010 and premiered in Santiago in November 2010.
 On his PBS travel Europe television series, Rick Steves covers Northern Spain and the Camino de Santiago in series 6.
In 2013, Simon Reeve presented the "Pilgrimage" series on BBC2, in which he followed various pilgrimage routes across Europe, including the Camino de Santiago in episode 2.
In 2014, Lydia B Smith and Future Educational Films released Walking the Camino: Six Ways to Santiago in theatres across the U.S. and Canada. The film features the accounts and perspectives of six pilgrims as they navigate their respective journeys from France to Santiago de Compostela. In 2015, it was distributed across the World, playing theatres throughout Europe, Australia, and New Zealand. It recently aired on NPTV and continues to be featured in festivals relating to the Spirituality, Mind Body, Travel, and Adventure.
In 2016, US cellist Dane Johansen featured in the documentary "Strangers on the Earth" while walking the Camino with his cello on his back and performing J.S.Bach's solo cello suites in churches along the way.
In The Trip to Spain (2017), the Camino de Santiago is mentioned as Rob Brydon quizzes Steve Coogan about what the Camino is and proceeds to explain what it is with a brief history of it.
In 2018, series one of BBC Two's Pilgrimage followed this pilgrimage.

Gallery

Selected literature 
(Alphabetical by author's surname)

See also 
Camino de Santiago (route descriptions)
Codex Calixtinus
Confraternity of Saint James
Cross of Saint James
Dominic de la Calzada
Hajj
Japan 100 Kannon Pilgrimage
Kumano Kodo
Mary Remnant
Order of Santiago
Palatine Ways of St. James
Path of Miracles
Shikoku Pilgrimage
Via Jacobi
Walking the Camino: Six Ways to Santiago
World Heritage Sites of the Routes of Santiago de Compostela in France

References

External links 

 

 
Catholic pilgrimage sites
Cultural landscapes
European Cultural Routes
Galician culture
Hiking trails in Europe
Pilgrimage routes
Religion in Galicia (Spain)
Santiago de Compostela
Spanish legends
World Heritage Sites in Spain